The Carroll's Irish Match Play Championship was a professional match play golf tournament played in the Republic of Ireland from 1969 to 1982. It was inaugurated by sponsors Carroll's in 1969, replacing the Carroll's Number 1 Tournament.

Finals results

References

Golf tournaments in the Republic of Ireland
1969 establishments in Ireland
1982 disestablishments in Ireland
Recurring sporting events established in 1969
Recurring sporting events disestablished in 1982